Jonah Mau'u (born 28 July 1998) is a New Zealand rugby union player, currently playing for  and . His preferred position is flanker or number 8.

Early career
Mau'u attended Royal School Dungannon in Northern Ireland in 2017. While in Northern Ireland, he represented Dungannon RFC and also represented Ulster in a friendly fixture.

Mau'u was born in Canberra, Australia and has Samoan and Croatian parentage. His brothers are both internationals for Croatia at rugby. Mau'u also attended school in Auckland and Hong Kong before settling in Northland.

Professional career
Mau'u was named in the  squad for the 2021 Bunnings NPC season, and was again named in the 2022 squad.

References

External links
itsrugby.co.uk Profile

1998 births
Living people
New Zealand rugby union players
Rugby union flankers
Rugby union number eights
Northland rugby union players
Moana Pasifika players
Rugby union players from Canberra